The Iron Pot Lighthouse (also known as the Derwent Lighthouse) is a lighthouse located on Iron Pot island in Storm Bay, at the mouth of the Derwent River in Hobart, Tasmania, Australia. Constructed in 1832 with convict labor, Iron Pot Lighthouse is the oldest lighthouse in Tasmania and oldest original tower in Australia. It was the first lighthouse in Australia to utilise locally manufactured optics, and became the first Australian lighthouse to use solar power in 1977.

History
During his circumnavigation of Van Diemen's Land in 1798, Matthew Flinders observed that the rocks in Storm Bay produced magnetic pulses that disorientated compasses. In the years following the founding of Hobart, early merchants and locals advocated for the construction of a light after a number of significant shipwrecks and groundings, including those of the Bombay (1830), SS Lintrose (1832), and the Princess Royal (1832), which had 300 free women settlers on board. Governor Arthur urged the Hobart Port Control in 1830 that a lighthouse be built in response to the 1827 sinking of the colonial commercial ship Hope.
Constructed on a firm rock foundation, the square-based, obelisk sandstone lighthouse was erected in 1832. Raised and lowered by hand, the original lighting apparatus was operated by a lighthouse keeper who lived in a tent with two convict aides. Although ship owners complained that the light source was insufficient, it was not upgraded until 1851.

Parkinson family home
The construction of a two-story house for lighthouse keeper James Parkinson and his family in 1884 significantly improved the island's living conditions. The home featured lead light windows, a cast-iron laced veranda with the bottom floor functioning as a classroom for Parkinson's seven children. Essie (or Elsie) Margaret Roberts, a child born to the headkeeper's wife in 1895, was the first and only person to be born on the island. The house was demolished in 1921 when the lighthouse became automated and the Marine Board failed to find a tenant.

Light source
An incandescent petroleum burner was introduced in 1904. It was the first lamp to employ vapourized kerosene as an illumination source in Australia. In 1977, the Marine Board converted the light's power source from acetylene gas to solar to reduce expenses, the first such conversion in Australia.

Access
The island is regularly circumnavigated by tourism operator Pennicott Wilderness Journeys, departing from Constitution Dock at Sullivan's Cove, Hobart. The lighthouse itself is automated and closed to the public.

Gallery

See also

 History of Tasmania
 List of lighthouses in Tasmania

References

External links

 Australian Maritime Safety Authority

1832 establishments in Australia
Convictism in Tasmania
History of Hobart
Lighthouses completed in 1832
Lighthouses in Tasmania
Tasmanian Heritage Register